Eugene Gentry "Guy" Neely (February 9, 1896 – December 2, 1949) was an American football player.  Despite having only one arm, he played college football at the guard position for Dartmouth College and was a consensus first-team selection to the 1917 College Football All-America Team.

Early years
Neely was born in 1896 in Comanche, Texas, and raised in Dallas, Texas.  His parents were Richard V. Neely and Opelia Gentry.  He lost his right arm in a hunting accident in approximately 1911. His arm was cut off above the elbow.

Dartmouth
Neely enrolled in Dartmouth College in 1915.  Neely played football for Dartmouth's freshman team in 1915. It was reported at the time that he was probably "the only one-armed football player in the country."

Neely then played for the Dartmouth Big Green football varsity team during the 1916 and 1917 football seasons. By October 1916, he had won a reputation as "the best man" in Dartmouth's line.  He reportedly used the stub of his severed right arm "with telling effect in blocking and straight arming." Despite his handicap, he was also able to intercept and return a forward pass, later described by Life magazine as a "spectacular" play, during a game against West Virginia.  After the 1917 season, he was selected as a consensus first-team guard on the 1917 College Football All-America Team.

Later years
After leaving Dartmouth, Neely returned to Texas and coached football at the Terrill School (now known as St. Mark's School of Texas).  He was married shortly after returning to Texas, and he and his wife Nell had two children, Stanley (born c. 1919) and Adele (born 1920).  In 1920, he was living in Comanche, Texas, working as an oil dealer.  In 1930, he was living in Dallas and working as a securities broker.  In 1940, he was living in Dallas and working as a loan agent for life insurance.  In 1942, he was employed by the Federal Housing Administration in Dallas.

Neely died in Dallas on December 2, 1949 at the age of 53.

Head coaching record

References

External links
 

1896 births
1949 deaths
American football guards
Austin Kangaroos football coaches
Dartmouth Big Green football players
All-American college football players
People from Comanche, Texas
Players of American football from Dallas
Businesspeople from Texas
American amputees
20th-century American businesspeople